Hermann Johannes "Boelie" Kessler (30 November 1896 – 17 August 1971) was a Dutch football player. Kessler - along with brother Dolf and cousins Tonny and Dé - played club football for amateur side HVV Den Haag. Kessler also won nine caps for the Dutch national side between 1919 and 1922, scoring two goals. He was the youngest son of Dutch oil entrepreneur Jean Baptiste August Kessler.

External links
 Player profile at VoetbalStats.nl

1896 births
1971 deaths
Dutch footballers
Netherlands international footballers
Footballers from The Hague
Association footballers not categorized by position
Kessler family